Alcarràs is a 2022 Spanish-Italian Catalan-language drama film directed by Carla Simón. It is set and shot in Alcarràs, Catalonia, in the Western dialect of the Catalan language, featuring a non-professional cast of actors. The plot concerns a family drama about the disappearance of traditional peach-harvesting activities. It won the Golden Bear at the 72nd Berlinale, thereby becoming the first Catalan-language film to do so. The film was selected as the Spanish entry for the Best International Feature Film at the 95th Academy Awards, but did not make the shortlist.

Plot 
Set in Alcarràs, in the area of Lleida in Catalonia, Spain, the plot consists of a family rural drama concerning the disappearance of agricultural activities, revolving around the intention to install solar panels in an agricultural plot hitherto occupied by a peach orchard, bringing the members of the Solé family to a stand off.

Cast

Production 
The screenplay was penned by the director Carla Simón alongside Arnau Vilaró. Shooting began on 1 June 2021 in the area of Alcarràs, province of Lleida, with the shooting window constrained to Summer due to the seasonal nature of the film's setting pertaining peach harvest cycles. The cast is formed by non-professional actors from the province of Lleida. Shot in Catalan, the entire cast used the local Western dialect (Lleidatà) of the Catalan language pertaining to the area. Filming wrapped after 8 weeks of shooting. María Zamora, Stefan Schmitz, Tono Folguera and Sergi Moreno were credited as producers.

Release 

The film screened in the official competition of the 72nd Berlinale on 15 February 2022. The film also screened at the 25th Málaga Festival in March 2022. Initially announced to run as part of the competitive list of the festival's official selection, the festival and the film producers agreed to screen the film out of competition instead. It was thus screened in Málaga on 19 March 2022.

Co-distributed by Avalon DA and Elastica Films in Spain, the film was theatrically released on 29 April 2022. Starting with a distribution limited to 169 theatres, the film was the most watched debut film in its opening weekend, and second film overall (first in Catalonia) after The Northman. Distributed by Wonder Pictures, it opened in Italian theatres on 26 May 2022. The film was selected within the 60th New York Film Festival's main slate. By the time Alcarràs was announced within the short-list of three films pre-selected by the Academy of Cinematographic Arts and Sciences of Spain for their submission to the 95th Academy Awards for Best International Feature Film on 25 August 2022, the film had grossed around €2.2 million at the Spanish box-office. On 13 September 2022, the film was disclosed as the final selection out of the shortlist. In December it was invited to the 28th Kolkata International Film Festival and was screened on 17 December 2022.

Reception

Critical reception

According to the review aggregation website Rotten Tomatoes, Alcarràs has a 90% approval rating based on 42 reviews from critics, with an average rating of 7.8/10. The critical consensus on the website reads: "While it may lack a narrative punch, Alcarràs captures this rural world and its heritage with a gripping sense of nostalgia for things forever gone." On Metacritic, which uses a weighted average, the film holds a score of 85 out of 100 based on 17 reviews indicating “universal acclaim.”

Reviewing for The Telegraph, Tim Robey rated the film with 5 out of 5 stars, considering that the film "manages a light, improvisatory mastery, an immaculate hold on tone, and a grave yet sunlit tableau of an ending, with each one of these faces turned in collective mourning, that I'll never forget". Fionnuala Halligan of ScreenDaily wrote that Alcarràs constitutes a "profoundly authentic and moving contemplation of the fragility of family, and, again, childhood" considering the film to have "all the hallmarks of a very specific film with emotionally wide appeal, a thoughtful essay which can also rattle and hum".

Guy Lodge of Variety considered that Alcarràs confirmed "the strength and consistency of Simón's directorial voice" after Summer 1993, also writing that it "balances a bristling political conscience against its tenderly observed domestic drama". Writing for Little White Lies, Caitlin Quinlan considered that the film "strikes a deft balance between idyllic reminiscence and melancholy for a cherished place", while also "delivering a poignant tale about the impact of industrial development on agriculture". Sergi Sánchez of Fotogramas considered that Simón gets to "translate into images what many neorealist filmmakers pursued unceasingly": "Truth, this time of a changing space and time, which appeals to the collective without losing the thread of the individual".

In August 2022, it was announced that Alcarràs was one of the three films shortlisted to be the Spanish entry for Best International Feature Film at the 95th Academy Awards alongside Rodrigo Sorogoyen's The Beasts and Alauda Ruiz de Azúa's Lullaby. Alcarràs ultimately was the official submission for the category.

Top ten lists 
The film appeared on a number of critics' top ten lists of the best European films of 2022:

In addition, it also appeared on top ten lists of the best Spanish films of 2022:

Accolades

See also 
 List of submissions to the 95th Academy Awards for Best International Feature Film
 List of Spanish submissions for the Academy Award for Best International Feature Film
 List of Spanish films of 2022
 List of Italian films of 2022

References

External links

2022 films
Films about agriculture
Films shot in the province of Lleida
Films set in Catalonia
Spanish drama films
Italian drama films
Golden Bear winners
Avalon films
2022 drama films
2020s Catalan-language films
2020s Spanish films
2020s Italian films